
Year 223 BC was a year of the pre-Julian Roman calendar. At the time it was known as the Year of the Consulship of Flaminus and Philus (or, less frequently, year 531 Ab urbe condita). The denomination 223 BC for this year has been used since the early medieval period, when the Anno Domini calendar era became the prevalent method in Europe for naming years.

Events 
 By place 
 Seleucid Empire 
 The Seleucid king Seleucus III is assassinated in Phrygia by members of his army while on campaign against Attalus of Pergamon.
 Seleucus is succeeded by his younger brother, Antiochus III. From the previous administration, Antiochus III retains Hermeias as his chief minister, Achaeus as governor of Anatolia, and Molon and his brother Alexander as governors of the eastern provinces of Media and Persis.

 Roman Republic 
 Gaius Flaminius is elected consul for the first time and, with Publius Furius Philus, he forces the Cisalpine Gauls to submit to Rome, creating the province of Cisalpine Gaul.

 Greece 
 The Spartan king Cleomenes III destroys and burns the city of Megalopolis but the inhabitants are saved by Philopoemen who leads the defence of the city until the inhabitants can escape.
 The king of Macedonia, Antigonus III Doson, restores Macedonian influence in the Peloponnese for the first time in almost two decades. After signing alliances with the Achaeans, Boeotians, Thessalians and the Acarnanians, Antigonus invades the Peloponnese and drives the Spartans out of Argos, taking Orchomenus and Mantineia in the process.

 Persia 
 King Diodotus II of Bactria is killed by a usurper, Euthydemus I, founder of the Greco-Bactrian Euthydemid dynasty.

 China  
 The Qin generals Wang Jian and  Meng Wu defeat the Chu general Xiang Yan and the king of Chu, Lord Changping. Lord Changping is killed, and Xiang Yan commits suicide soon afterwards.

Births

Deaths 
 Lord Changping, the last king of Chu, one of the Seven Warring States in ancient China.
 Diodotus II, King of Bactria, the son and successor of Diodotus I (approximate date) (b. c. 252 BC)
 Seleucus III, king of the Seleucid dynasty from 226 BC (assassinated) (b. c. 243 BC)

References